WCLQ (89.5 FM) is a radio station licensed to Wausau, Wisconsin, United States, and airs a Christian contemporary format.  The station is owned by Christian Life Communications, Inc.

References

External links
WCLQ official website

Contemporary Christian radio stations in the United States
Radio stations established in 1988
1988 establishments in Wisconsin
CLQ